The Wilaya of Relizane massacres of 30 December 1997 were probably the single bloodiest day of killing in the Algerian conflict of the 1990s. Several members of the population of four villages were killed; the exact number of casualties has varied according to source.

Background
In 1998, Algeria was near the peak of a brutal civil conflict that had begun after the military's cancellation of 1992 elections set to be won by the Islamic Salvation Front (FIS).  The arid, inaccessible, poor Ouarsenis Mountains about 150 miles west of Algiers had previously experienced little or no violence.  In the 1997 elections, the inhabitants had mainly voted for the pro-government FLN and RND.

On the first day of Ramadan, at about 6:15 pm, assailants, armed with axes and knives, swept down on four farming villages in the Ammi Moussa area, and killed hundreds of people as they sat down to break their fast:
 at Kherarba or Ouled Kherarba or Khrouba or Khourba, 21 (official) or 176 (Liberté) were killed;
 at Sahnoun or Ouled Sahnoun or Ouled Sahnine or Ouled Sahrine or Ouled Sahnine, 29 or 113 were killed;
 at El-Abadel or Al Abadel, 73 (Liberté) were killed;
 at Ouled-Tayeb or Oulad Taieb or Ben Taïyeb or Douar Ouled Tayeb, 28 or 50 were killed.

The attackers killed families indiscriminately in their homes, men, women, children, and babies, beheading some and butchering others. They threw babies over walls, and reportedly even butchered dogs and livestock.  They left only at dawn. The assailants were dressed as “Afghans.” Survivors were quoted in the Algerian press as identifying the leader of the assailants as Aoued Abdallah, called "Cheikh Noureddine", a head in western Algeria of the Armed Islamic Group (GIA). It was also reported that pamphlets distributed in Algiers previously had announced ""We will arrive here soon. We have breakfasted in Algiers, we will dine in Oran. Signed - GIA". The massacres were followed shortly afterwards by the Wilaya of Relizane massacres of 4 January 1998; together, these events provoked a widespread exodus from the region.

The Algerian government told the UN Commission on Human Rights (E/CN.4/2000/3/Add.1)  that "On 31 December 1997, a judicial inquiry was opened and on 8 February 1998 the examining magistrate ordered that further investigations be carried out. The legal proceedings continue."

Reports of casualties
As a result of the massacre: 78 people (initial official estimate), 252 people (according to Le Matin and El Watan, quoting hospital sources), 272 people (according to the Algerian government's statement to the UN Commission on Human Rights (E/CN.4/2000/3/Add.1) or 412 people (according to Liberté) were killed in four villages.

See also
 List of Algerian massacres of the 1990s
 List of massacres in Algeria

External links
  BBC
  L'Humanite
  Reuters
  LA Times quoted
  AI-Net
  Dagbladet.no

Algerian massacres of the 1990s
Massacres in 1997
1997 in Algeria
Conflicts in 1997
December 1997 events in Africa